Mih Ouensa District is a district of El Oued Province, Algeria. As of the 2008 census, it has a population of 22,423.

Communes

Mih Ouensa District consists of two communes:
Mih Ouensa
Oued El Alenda

References

Districts of El Oued Province